Oligochaeta is a genus of Asian plants in the tribe Cardueae within the family Asteraceae.

Oligochaeta is native to central, southern, and southwestern Asia. They are annual plants that grow in mountain and steppe habitat.

It is part of the Rhaponticum group in the tribe Cardueae, along with the genera Rhaponticum, Acroptilon, Callicephalus, Leuzea, Myopordon, and Ochrocephala. It can be distinguished from other genera by its pollen.

 Species
 Oligochaeta divaricata - Caucasus, Iran, Iraq, Syria, Turkey
 Oligochaeta minima - Xinjiang, Kazakhstan, Turkmenistan, Uzbekistan, Iran, Afghanistan
 Oligochaeta ramosa - Indian Subcontinent
 Oligochaeta tomentosa - Caucasus, Iran

 formerly included
Oligochaeta leucosmerinx Rech.f. & Köie	- Schischkinia albispina (Bunge) Iljin

References

Asteraceae genera
Cynareae